Xi Aurigae, Latinized from ξ Aurigae, is the Bayer designation for a single, white-hued star in the northern constellation of Auriga. This star was once considered part of the constellation of Camelopardalis and held the Flamsteed designation 32 Camelopardalis. It is visible to the naked eye with an apparent visual magnitude of +5.0. At that distance, the visual magnitude of the star is diminished by an extinction of 0.108 due to interstellar dust.

This is an A-type main sequence star with a stellar classification of A2 Va. Although it was one of the first stars to be cataloged as a Lambda Boötis star, Murphy et al. (2015) don't consider it to be a member of this population. The star has nearly twice the mass of the Sun and about 1.1 times the Sun's radius. It is an estimated 174 million years old and is spinning with a projected rotational velocity of 62 km/s. Xi Aurigae is radiating 49.5 times the Sun's luminosity from its photosphere at an effective temperature of around 9,152 K.

References

External links
 HR 2029
 Image Xi Aurigae

A-type main-sequence stars
Aurigae, Xi
Auriga (constellation)
Durchmusterung objects
Aurigae, 30
039283
027949
2029